Penny Severns (1952–1998) was a member of the Illinois Senate who represented the 51st Senate District from 1987 until her death in February 1998.

Early life
Severns was born January 21, 1952, in Decatur, Illinois. After graduating high school, she attended Southern Illinois University's Carbondale campus. While in college, at the age of 20, she served as an alternate delegate to the 1972 Democratic National Convention, the then youngest person elected to serve in that role. In 1974, she graduated with a bachelor's degree in political science and international relations.

In 1977, Severns served for two years as a special assistant to the administrator of the Agency for International Development. In this capacity she traveled to Nepal, India and Thailand where she audited the United States' mission in those countries and represented the agency during the negotiations of the Camp David Accords. While in Washington, Severns was also resident associate at the Smithsonian Institution. After leaving the State Department Severns took a job with the Decatur-based Archer Daniels Midland.

In 1980 she ran for Congress against Edward Rell Madigan, but lost in a year that heavily favored the Republican Party. In her second attempt for public office, she won a seat on the Decatur City Council with the largest number of votes in the city's history at that time.

In 1983, Severns became the Democratic Party of Illinois's Central Committeewoman from Illinois's 20th congressional district serving alongside Central Committeeman Vince Demuzio. In 1996, she was succeeded by Ellen Sinclair of Salem, Illinois.

Illinois Senate
In 1986, she ran for the Illinois Senate against ten-year incumbent James H. Rupp and won in one of the few upset races for the Illinois General Assembly that year. Though Rupp was the earlier favorite, a combination of a media savvy candidate, a well-planned campaign strategy, keeping the focus on chosen issues and targeting of rural areas that Rupp had neglected were credited with the success of her campaign.

In the Senate, she held the position of minority caucus whip. She also served as minority spokesperson of the Revenue Committee and on the Executive Committee and Legislative Audit Commission. She rose to become the senior Democrat on the Appropriations Committee and was the first woman to ever be appointed chief budget negotiator. She was viewed as an advocate for working families,  breast cancer awareness and who helped in the preservation of the Dana–Thomas House in Springfield. In 1989, Senator Severns was selected from a nationwide group of legislators to participate as a fellow at Harvard University's Kennedy School of Government. Her work there earned her a position to study public policy with the National Conference of State Legislatures.

In late 1993, Severns announced that she was going to run for the Democratic nomination for Illinois Comptroller, but later switched to running for Lieutenant Governor of Illinois. After the primary election, she was paired with Dawn Clark Netsch, which is the first and only time in Illinois history that two women were the top of the ticket. During the campaign, Severns was diagnosed with breast cancer. Ultimately, Clark Netsch and Severns lost to Jim Edgar and Bob Kustra.

Death and legacy
After the election, her health continued to deteriorate with the cancer spreading to her lungs and her skull. Despite this, she chose to run for Secretary of State in 1998. However, she was removed from the ballot after one of her opponents, Orland Park Chief of Police Tim McCarthy, challenged her petitions for not having the sufficient number of signatures. This narrowed the race to McCarthy and eventually nominee and current Secretary of State Jesse White. Roughly a week after her removal from the ballot, Severns died of cancer. Former Macon County Board Chairman Kevin Kehoe was appointed her successor, but lost election to a full term  later that year to State Representative Duane Noland of Blue Mound.

Severns is the namesake of the Illinois Secretary of State's Summer Family Literacy program and the Penny Severns Breast and Cervical Cancer Research Fund. The portion of Interstate 72 between Springfield and Decatur is named in her honor. Her alma mater, Southern Illinois University, established four scholarships in her honor funded through a combination of state and private funding. Three of the scholarships went to students to cover one year of costs while a fourth scholarship was awarded to a Macon County resident.

At the time of her death, Severns was in a relationship with journalist Terry Mutchler; however, due to the stigma against same-sex relationships at the time, they kept the relationship secret. Mutchler was later the executive director of the Pennsylvania Office of Open Records. In November 2014 a book Mutchler wrote about her relationship with Severns, titled Under This Beautiful Dome, was published.

References

Democratic Party Illinois state senators
1952 births
1998 deaths
Illinois city council members
Southern Illinois University Carbondale alumni
LGBT state legislators in Illinois
Women state legislators in Illinois
Lesbian politicians
People of the United States Agency for International Development
Deaths from cancer in Illinois
People from Decatur, Illinois
20th-century American politicians
Women city councillors in Illinois
20th-century American women politicians
20th-century American LGBT people